Nityananda Datta  (13 August 1933 – 14 May 2020) is an Indian film-maker who is originally from Chittagong, Bangladesh.

Datta is best known for his work with Satyajit Ray as his assistant director. This body of work includes his support of some of Ray's most renowned works depicting life and struggles of people in Calcutta and West Bengal, including Charulata, Aparajito, Kanchenjungha, Devi, The World of Apu, and Jalsaghar. Later in his career, Dutta also directed his own features, including Baksa Badal (1970) and Hathat Dekha (1967). After relocating to Bombay, Dutta supported film-maker Hrishikesh Mukherjee as associate director in several more films. He also worked on several documentary films sponsored by Doordarshan between 1977 - 1983.

References

Bengali film producers
Living people
People from Chittagong
Year of birth missing (living people)
Film directors from Kolkata